The Steamobile was an American steam car manufactured in Keene, New Hampshire, from 1900 until 1902, first by the Trinity Cycle Manufacturing Company and its successor, the Steamobile Company of America.

History 
Reynold Janney factory superintendent of the Trinity Cycle Manufacturing Company developed a steam car that he marketed in the fall of 1900. The Keene Steamobile was powered by a two-cylinder double-acting 7/9-hp engine, with a water-tube boiler with 420 copper tubes and priced at $850, .  Janney organized the Keene Automobile Company which was purchased in February 1901 by  E. P. Wells and Winfield S. Rogers and the newly formed Steamobile Company of America.  Reynold Janney departed and became superintendent of the Locomobile Works for two years.  W. S. Rogers became the new factory superintendent and added a dos-a-dos model priced at $900.

In 1901 Steamobile displayed at the Pan-American Exposition, and added a new model called a Transit that had a tonneau body up front.  Advertised as a railroad inspection car or package delivery it was available for $1,000, .  F. Wilkinson & Co. of Manchester became the sole agent for Steamobile in Great Britain and displayed at the 1902 Royal Agricultural Hall Motor Show.

E. P. Wells and W. S. Rogers set-up a new company called the Roller Bearing and Equipment Company of America in the Steamobile factory.  In June 1902 Standard Roller Bearing of Philadelphia purchased the Steamobile Company and the Roller Bearing company factory at Keene, which included 40 unsold Steamobiles.

References

External links 

 Steamobile Company of America at the VirtualSteamCarMuseum.com

Steam cars
Veteran vehicles
Defunct motor vehicle manufacturers of the United States
Defunct manufacturing companies based in New Hampshire
Cars introduced in 1900
1900s cars
Vehicle manufacturing companies established in 1900
Vehicle manufacturing companies disestablished in 1902
Companies based in Cheshire County, New Hampshire
1900 establishments in New Hampshire
1902 disestablishments in New Hampshire